The 1963 UK & Ireland Greyhound Racing Year was the 37th year of greyhound racing in the United Kingdom and Ireland.

Roll of honour

Summary
The Greyhound Afternoon Service was established whereby tracks supplied afternoon racing for the larger bookmaking clients. However the track promoters made a request for a guaranteed payment for the off course rights from all bookmakers taking bets from their stadium. Negotiations would continually take place between the stadiums, the National Greyhound Racing Society (NGRS) and the bookmakers. The problems had been ongoing since the introduction of the Betting and Gaming Act 1960. Clapton Stadiums Ltd owners of Clapton Stadium, Slough and Reading scrapped evening starting times in an attempt to disrupt the betting in bookmaker's shops. Tracks racing during the afternoon had already implemented this procedure. A further development resulted in the tracks ending the annual £100,000 agreement with the off course bookmakers to provide forecast and tricast tote odds. The bookmakers announced that they will provide their own odds based on starting prices.

Figures released by the NGRS showed a further decline in attendances and totalisator turnover, the first six months of 1963 showed attendances at 5,827,064 with turnover at £24,910,749 from 61 member tracks.  

We'll See was voted Greyhound of the Year at the Silver Greyhound Awards, in the Great Room at the Grosvenor House Hotel. The brindle dog beat Cranog Bet to the crown, the latter had to settle for being named bitch of the year.

Tracks
News broke at the beginning of the year that London Stadiums Ltd had future plans to redevelop Wandsworth Stadium into a shopping centre. Racing came to an end at Somerton Park in Newport, Wales, Clydeholm in Clydebank, Banister Court Stadium in Southampton and Hanley Greyhound Stadium.  Two tracks opened at the Taff's Well and Milton Keynes.

News
Alfred Critchley died on 9 February. Clapton hosted Pinewood Studios as they shot scenes for a new film starring Rita Tushingham and Mike Sarne called A Place to Go.

Competitions
The Merit Puppy Championship held at Wimbledon was renamed and rebranded with more prize money, it would be called the Juvenile. The Gold Collar at Catford Stadium was won by Music Guest from Lucky Boy Boy, Irish Greyhound Derby champion Shanes Legacy finished last in the final and apart from winning the 1,000 Guineas would not live up to the expectations of his owner since his purchase from Ireland in 1962.  

The 1962 greyhound of the year Dromin Glory had a Welsh Greyhound Derby campaign to forget, he weighed in too heavy in a trial and therefore another needed to be organised at short notice. He arrived late for kennelling for the second attempt, missing the deadline and as a result was not allowed to compete in the first round.   

Leeds defeated Brighton in the final of the News of the World National Intertrack Championship.

Ireland
Irish Greyhound Derby finalists both won major events in Ireland, Melody Wonder won the national Sprint held at the Dunmore Stadium and Powerstown Proper won the Laurels at Cork Greyhound Stadium.

In addition to the 10% government tax on off-course bets the Irish government introduce a further tax of 2.5% on all bets on-course and off-course.

Principal UK races

Totalisator returns

The totalisator returns declared to the licensing authorities for the year 1963 are listed below.

References 

Greyhound racing in the United Kingdom
Greyhound racing in the Republic of Ireland
UK and Ireland Greyhound Racing Year
UK and Ireland Greyhound Racing Year
UK and Ireland Greyhound Racing Year
UK and Ireland Greyhound Racing Year